The 8th Wyoming Territorial Legislature was a former meeting of the Wyoming Legislature that lasted from January 8, to March 7, 1884.

History

On January 8, 1884, the territorial legislature convened in the Commercial Block in Cheyenne although E. U. Snider would not be seated until January 9. William C. Irvine made a motion to have Philip Dater selected as temporary President of the Council and it was accepted. On January 9, Robert H. Homer made a motion to have William H. Holliday selected as permanent President of the Council and it was accepted.

On January 8, John F. Coad made a motion to have N. N. Craig selected as temporary Speaker of the House of Representatives and it was accepted. On January 9, the selection of the permanent Speaker of the House started. F. H. Jones was nominated by O. C. Smith and D. Miller was nominated by Coad. The House of Representatives voted fourteen to nine in favor of Jones and a motion by Coad to make Jones' nomination unanimous was accepted.

Membership

Council

Members of the Wyoming Council

House of Representatives

Members of the Wyoming Council

References

Wyoming legislative sessions